Leulinghem is a commune in the Pas-de-Calais department in the Hauts-de-France region of France.

The Truce of Leulinghem was signed in Leulinghem in June 1389.

Geography
A small village situated 5 miles (8 km) southwest of Saint-Omer, on the D212 road, half a mile from the A26 autoroute.

Population

Places of interest
 The church of St. Maurice, dating from the twelfth century.

See also
Communes of the Pas-de-Calais department
Truce of Leulinghem

References

Communes of Pas-de-Calais